Chinit River (alternates: Stung Chinit or Stoeng Chinith) is a river of Cambodia. Located in Kampong Thom Province, it is a major tributary of the Tonlé Sap Lake ("Great Lake"), which joins the Tonlé Sap River at the downstream end in the larger Mekong basin. The  prehistoric archaeological site of Samrong Sen is located on the river bank. Water resource projects, commencing in 1971 and in 2003, have had various measures of success. The river is an important trade route.

Geography

The river passes through the Bolaven Plateau of Laos, reaches its highest elevation point, at Phumi Chrach, and ends at its outflow point on Tonlé Sap Lake at an elevation of .There are gentler slopes noted towards the downstream. Its main lake is Bung Real Lake.

The main city along the river is Santuk District Capital. Samrong Sen, a prehistoric archaeological site of Neolithic Age is located on its right bank.

Climate
The records of the Agrometerological Group of FAO of Research and Technology Development Division  show the sunshine hours as 7.3 hours per day and the solar radiation at an annual average of 19.5 MJ/m2 per day.

Water resources

1971 public works project
The dam planned at Phnom Takho was to provide irrigation benefits with canal systems planned on both banks of the river, and also for power generation. The project was also anticipated to bring in changes in the fish production both upstream and downstream of the dam location.

The project was to cover the districts of Santuk and Baray in the Kampong Thom Province. It was partially implemented between the 1970s and the 1980s, with the main diversion structure and the main canal with head regulators built during the Khmer Rouge regime using forced labour. Some of the structures that were built, were subsequently damaged by regime soldiers who were "grenade fishing". The system was found to be lacking in proper planning and design concepts, and also dubious construction methods were adopted in many respects, which caused frequent flooding and damages to structures and canal systems.

2003 public works project
Consequent to this, a fresh start was made by launching The Stung Chinit Irrigation and Rural Infrastructure Project (SCIRIP), with technical and financial inputs of US$ 23.8 million equivalent from the Government of the Kingdom of Cambodia, the Asian Development Bank (ADB), Agence Française de Développement and the beneficiaries. The objective was to increase agricultural productivity and to stimulate the rural economy in the province.

The project, launched in 2003, was implemented over a six-year period.  It included improvements to the drainage infrastructure,  of rural roads, six markets, and extension services.  Stakeholder participation occurred through Water User groups. By 2007, three communes and 24 villages in one district had benefited from the public works project. According to a 2008 ADB report, "The resettlement plan included three phases to cover the irrigation/drainage canal infrastructure, the reservoir area and the Otchork tributary area. All phases have been satisfactorily implemented but some longer-term income restoration activities are still ongoing and require post-project monitoring".

Navigation
Inland navigation is practiced to a very limited extent due to shallow draft. Fishing and community boats are plied by villagers who reside on the banks of the river, for fishing and to transport goods to the markets.

Land use
The Chinit River basin land use distribution is 75.5% under forest cover, 14.8% under paddy cultivation and the balance area is under other agricultural uses. Agricultural farming, mostly during the wet season of rice cultivation (seasonal rice and floating rice) is the major economic activity of the people living in the valley. Rice is also grown during the non-rainy season, but its acreage is limited to 10% of the cultivated area. White corn, green beans and tobacco are also grown in the higher elevations of the valley.

Aquafauna
The Chinit River has been a subject of studies on fish migration. Movement of fish has been studied on Chinit and also on other rivers in the Mekong through sampling techniques carried out in  stretches upstream of the flooded areas, to identify larval and fry fish in five tributaries. Seventy-one species belonging to 17 families have been recorded in the Chinit River. It was also noted during these studies that the species recorded were distinctive for each tributary but the fish fauna found in Chinit and Stung tributaries were identical.

References

Bibliography

Rivers of Cambodia
Tonlé Sap
Geography of Kampong Thom province